The Boy Across the Street is an Israeli film directed by Yosef Shalhin and produced by Leo Filler and Margot Klausner. The Boy Across the Street sold 514,600 tickets. The movie won excellence merit in the children's movies category in Venice Film Festival.

Plot
David (Shaul Shalhin) is a twelve year old boy living with his father (Arieh Elias). The father quit his job and god drunk after his wife left home and become penniless, unable to support his only child. The father alienated his son and hit him, David's only comfort is his loyal dog and his neighbour Tamar (Hannah Shalhin), a cripple girl he is hanging around with. Two culprits offers him a solution to his financial mishap: they ask him to join them to a burglary. The burglary happened to be a failure, his two partners arrested and the police try to catch David. David's father, see his son's misfortune, went to his aid.

Cast
 Shaul Shalhin - David 
 Arieh Elias - David's father 
 Hannah Shalhin - Tamar
 Baruch David - Tamar's father
 Ya'ackov Banai - Grocery salesman

References

External links
 The Boy Across the Street in IMDb
 The Boy Across the Street in Book of Israeli Cinema site

1960s Hebrew-language films
Israeli coming-of-age drama films
1960s coming-of-age drama films
1965 films
1965 drama films